Colenis is a genus of round fungus beetles in the family Leiodidae. There are about eight described species in Colenis.

Species
These eight species belong to the genus Colenis:
 Colenis bifida Peck, 1998
 Colenis bonnairei Jacquelin du Val, 1859
 Colenis immunda (Sturm, 1807)
 Colenis impunctata LeConte, 1853
 Colenis laevis LeConte, 1853
 Colenis ora Peck, 1998-01
 Colenis stephani Peck, 1998-01
 Colenis terrena Hisamatsu, 1985

References

Further reading

External links

 

Leiodidae
Articles created by Qbugbot